Zerelda is a given name. Notable people with the name include:

Zerelda James (1825–1911), the mother of Frank James and Jesse James
Zerelda Mimms (1845–1900), the wife and first cousin of Jesse James
Zerelda G. Wallace (1817–1901), early temperance and women's suffrage leader

See also
Zelda (given name)

Feminine given names